The Kuwaiti ambassador in Washington, D. C. is the official representative of the Government in Kuwait City to the Government of the United States.

List of representatives

References 

 
United States
Kuwait